The Vallecitos Nuclear Center is a nuclear research facility, and the site of a former GE Hitachi Nuclear Energy electricity-generating nuclear power plant in unincorporated Alameda County, California, United States.

The Vallecitos boiling water reactor (VBWR) was the first privately owned and operated nuclear power plant to deliver significant quantities of electricity to a public utility grid. During the period October 1957 to December 1963, it delivered approximately 40,000 megawatt-hours of electricity.  This reactor—a light-water moderated and cooled, enriched uranium reactor using stainless steel-clad, plate-type fuel—was a pilot plant and test bed for fuel, core components, controls, and personnel training for the Dresden Nuclear Power Plant, a Commonwealth Edison station built in Illinois five years later.

The plant was originally a collaborative effort of General Electric and Pacific Gas and Electric Company, with Bechtel Corporation serving as engineering contractor.  Samuel Untermyer II, the General Electric engineer responsible for the initial design of the VBWR, had performed much of the conceptual research at Argonne National Laboratory while conducting heat transfer and nuclear physics experiments, including the BORAX experiments. Vallecitos Power Plant held the US Atomic Energy Commission's "Power Reactor License No. 1". The main power generating facilities closed in 1963. The discovery of an active fault running beneath the facility led to the closure of its most productive reactors in 1977.

The Vallecitos site includes the Radioactive Materials Laboratory where post-irradiation examinations are carried out.  A small 100-kilowatt research reactor called the "Nuclear Test Reactor" (NTR, NRC License R-33) is still in operation at the site. It utilizes U-AL alloy fuel, and is currently used for nondestructive material imaging. Vallecitos also fabricates radioactive source materials used in medicine and industry, under a license issued by the State of California.

References

External links

GEH Vallecitos Web site
Video of Opening of Vallecitos Nuclear Center (archived)
Nukeworker description of Vallecitos (archived)
EVESR Nuclear Superheat Fuel Development Project, First Quarterly Report (1963)

Energy infrastructure completed in 1957
Buildings and structures in Alameda County, California
Nuclear power plants in California
Former nuclear power stations in the United States
Science and technology in the San Francisco Bay Area
Energy in the San Francisco Bay Area
Former power stations in California
1957 establishments in California